The 1989 Paris–Tours was the 83rd edition of the Paris–Tours cycle race and was held on 8 October 1989. The race started in Chaville and finished in Tours. The race was won by Jelle Nijdam of the Superconfex team.

General classification

References

1989 in French sport
1989
1989 UCI Road World Cup
1989 in road cycling
October 1989 sports events in Europe